Artjom Dmitrijev (born 14 November 1988) is an Estonian professional footballer who plays as a midfielder for Uzbekistan Super League club Qizilqum Zarafshon, and formerly the Estonia national team.

Career

Club
On 22 January 2019, FC Okzhetpes announced the signing of Dmitrijev.

International
Dmitrijev made his senior international debut for the Estonia on 9 June 2015, replacing Sergei Zenjov in the 79th minute of a 2–0 away victory over Finland in a friendly.

Honours

Club
Levadia
Estonian Cup: 2009–10
Estonian Supercup: 2010

Nõmme Kalju
Estonian Cup: 2014–15

References

External links

1988 births
Living people
Footballers from Tallinn
Estonian footballers
Estonian people of Russian descent
Association football midfielders
Esiliiga players
Meistriliiga players
FC TVMK players
JK Tarvas Rakvere players
JK Narva Trans players
FCI Levadia Tallinn players
JK Sillamäe Kalev players
FCI Tallinn players
Nõmme Kalju FC players
A Lyga players
FK Vėtra players
Challenger Pro League players
Royal Antwerp F.C. players
KFC Turnhout players
Veikkausliiga players
FC Lahti players
FC Okzhetpes players
FC Zhetysu players
Kazakhstan Premier League players
FC Qizilqum Zarafshon players
Uzbekistan Super League players
Estonia youth international footballers
Estonia under-21 international footballers
Estonia international footballers
Estonian expatriate footballers
Estonian expatriate sportspeople in Lithuania
Expatriate footballers in Lithuania
Estonian expatriate sportspeople in Belgium
Expatriate footballers in Belgium
Estonian expatriate sportspeople in Finland
Expatriate footballers in Finland
FCI Levadia U21 players
Estonian expatriate sportspeople in Kazakhstan
Expatriate footballers in Kazakhstan
Expatriate footballers in Uzbekistan
Estonian expatriate sportspeople in Uzbekistan